There are over 20,000 Grade II* listed buildings in England. This page is a list of these buildings in the district of Plymouth in Devon.

City of Plymouth

|}

Notes

External links

Plymouth
Buildings and structures in Plymouth, Devon